Paraplatyptilia auriga is a moth of the family Pterophoridae described by William Barnes and Arthur Ward Lindsey in 1921. It is found in eastern North America, including Florida, Mississippi, and New Jersey.

The larvae feed on Gerardia species and various Asteraceae species.

References

Moths described in 1921
auriga
Endemic fauna of the United States
Moths of North America